National Route 212 is a national highway of Japan connecting Nakatsu, Ōita and Aso, Kumamoto in Japan, with a total length of 106.8 km (66.36 mi).

References

National highways in Japan
Roads in Kumamoto Prefecture
Roads in Ōita Prefecture